Harry E. Kirchner Jr. (June 13, 1937 – February 20, 1993) was an American college basketball player. He played for the TCU Horned Frogs from 1956 to 1959.

Standing , Kirchner was the tallest Horned Frogs player until the mid-1970s. He was a starter for two seasons and led the Horned Frogs to a Southwest Conference (SWC) championship in 1959. During the 1958–59 season, Kirchner was named as the SWC Player of the Year while he led the SWC in scoring (19.6 points) and rebounding (13.4 rebounds) per game.

Kirchner was selected by the Cincinnati Royals as the 33rd overall pick of the 1959 NBA draft. He played two seasons for the Phillips 66ers of the National Industrial Basketball League (NIBL) from 1959 to 1961.

Kirchner died on February 20, 1993, at his home in Dripping Springs, Texas. He was inducted into the TCU Lettermen's Hall of Fame in 2012.

References

External links

College statistics

1937 births
1993 deaths
American men's basketball players
Basketball players from Houston
Centers (basketball)
Cincinnati Royals draft picks
Phillips 66ers players
TCU Horned Frogs men's basketball players